
Gmina Kamienica is a rural gmina (administrative district) in Limanowa County, Lesser Poland Voivodeship, in southern Poland.

Villages
Gmina Kamienica contains the villages and settlements of Kamienica, Szczawa, Zalesie, Zasadne and Zbludza.

Neighbouring gminas
Gmina Kamienica is bordered by the gminas of Dobra, Łącko, Łukowica, Mszana Dolna, Niedźwiedź, Nowy Targ, Ochotnica Dolna and Słopnice.

References
Polish official population figures 2006

Kamienica
Limanowa County